The Plymouth Gladiators are a speedway team in the British SGB Championship. Under several names Plymouth have competed during various seasons from 1932. The club was reformed after a gap of thirty-six years in 2006 by former St Austell Gulls rider Mike Bowden In 2021 the club successfully applied to join the British second division, the SGB Championship. The team names included Tigers, Panthers, Devils and Bulldogs

History

1932–1937
Plymouth's original home was Pennycross Stadium. As the Plymouth Tigers they competed in the first National League season in the 1932 Speedway National League. The Tigers became the Panthers for the 1936 season and the stadium was used in 1937.

1947–1954
The stadium re-opened in 1947 when the Devils raced in the 1947 Speedway National League Division Three. Apart from short spells in the Second Division the team operated at this level until 1954. In 1952, the team achieved their first major success, winning the Division three section of the National Trophy. They defeated Rayleigh Rockets in the final.  After another season in the Southern League (1953) they withdrew from the 1954 Speedway National League Division Two.

1961–1969
The track re-opened for a couple of years in the 1961 Provincial Speedway League (as the Plymouth Bulldogs) and 1962. It re-opened 1968 and had spells in the British League Division Two.

2006–present

Temporary planning permission was awarded for a new speedway track in 2006, but in August 2007 the club was granted full planning permission. During the 2006 Speedway Conference League the club finished first in the regular season table but lost in the play off final. Two years later in 2008 they repeated the feat of topping the table but once again lost in the playoffs. They did however gain consolation when winning the Conference League Knockout Cup. One year later they reached the play off final during the 2009 National League speedway season.

In 2011, the club moved up to division 2 and in 2014 they ran a junior side called the Devon Demons, previously the Demons had been the junior side for the Exeter Falcons. They stayed in division 2 until 2017 when they dropped back down to division 3.

In 2019, they changed their name from the Devils to the Gladiators and in 2021 competed in the second division again, called the SGB Championship. In 2022, the club also ran a NDL side called the Centurions.

Season summary

Riders previous seasons

2007 team

2008 team

2009 team

2010 team

Also rode

2013 team

Also rode

2014 team

Also rode

2015 team

Also rode

2016 team

Also rode

2018 team

 Ellis Perks
 Henry Atkins
 Tim Webster
 Richard Andrews
 Ryan Terry-Daley
 Kelsey Dugard
 Macauley Leek

Also rode
 Adam Sheppard
 Adam Roynon
 James Cockle
 Bradley Andrews

2019 team
 Ben Wilson
 Nathan Stoneman
 Richard Andrews
 Adam Sheppard
 Tom Young
 Jamie Bursill
 Kris Andrews

2021 team

Also Rode

2022 team

 (C)

Also Rode

References

National League speedway teams
Speedway Premier League teams
Sport in Plymouth, Devon